Tshepo Motsepe (born 17 June 1953) is a South African physician and businesswoman. She is the First Lady of South Africa, as the wife of Cyril Ramaphosa, the President of South Africa. She is the older sister of Bridgette Radebe and her brother is Patrice Motsepe.

Biography 
Tshepo Motsepe studied as a medical doctor at the University of KwaZulu-Natal and completed her masters in public health at Harvard School of Public Health. In 2012, she completed a Social Entrepreneurship Certificate Program (SECP) at the Gordon Institute of Business Science. She is the current chairperson of the African Self Help Trust (ASHA Trust), focusing on Early Childhood Development and Education.

She has worked in both public and private practice in Mmakau, Mahikeng, Johannesburg, Pretoria, and in Zimbabwe. She's a former Deputy Director of The Reproductive Health Research Institute.

Family
Motsepe is married to Cyril Ramaphosa, President of the Republic of South Africa, with whom she has four children. Motsepe is Ramaphosa's third wife. Her father is the late Chief Augustine Butana Chaane Motsepe, her brother is the mining magnate Patrice Motsepe, and her sister Bridgette Radebe, wife of African National Congress (ANC) politician and former Minister of Energy, Jeff Radebe.

References

Living people
People from Soweto
University of KwaZulu-Natal alumni
Harvard School of Public Health alumni
First Ladies of South Africa
South African Tswana people
1953 births